Sara J. King (born 1982) is an Alaskan Fantasy writer residing in the Alaska Bush.  She is currently working on her 11th novel, part of the "After Earth" series

History
Sara King was born in Fairbanks, Alaska, in 1982. She has remained an Alaskan ever since, graduating from Chugiak High School in 2001 and beginning her full-time writing career shortly thereafter.  She is an outdoors enthusiast.    Her works have appeared in short-story magazines, including Apex Science Fiction and Horror, BBT Magazine, and Aberrant Dreams.

In March 2007, King was chosen from a pool of 50 candidates to edit Aberrant Dreams, where she works as a contributing editor.

In August 2007, a 7500-word short piece "The Moldy Dead," a short story spinoff of The Legend of ZERO series, became King's first published short work in Apex Science Fiction and Horror Digest, where it received a positive review from the reviewer.

In March 2008, King joined the Codex Writers Group, an online gathering of professional speculative fiction writers, editors, and agents.  Here, she workshopped her short fantasy works "The Sheet-Charmer of Broketoe" and "The Auldhund," which won semi-finalist in the First Quarter 2008 Writers of the Future Contest.

In July 2008, King graduated from the 6-week Odyssey Writing Workshop in New Hampshire.

Bibliography

Aulds of the SPYRE
Form and Function (2016)

Guardians of the First Realm
Alaskan Fire (2012), ISBN B0073WZ01C
Alaskan Fury (2012), ISBN B007P4CY26

The Legend of ZERO
 Forging Zero (2013)
 Zero Recall (2013)
 Zero's Return (2014)
 Forgotten (2022)

The legend of ZERO short stories
 Moldy Dead  (2013)
 The Many Misadventures of Flea, Agent of Chaos (2015)
 The Scientist, the Rat, and the Assassin (2016)

Millennium Potion
 Wings of Retribution (2013), ISBN B007W6RBSE

Outer Bounds
 Fortune's Rising (2014), ISBN B008HYWOHI
 Fortune's Folly (2016)

Terms of Mercy
 To the Princess Bound (2012), ISBN B008283TVO

Short stories
 “Fairy”, Blood, Blade, and Thruster Magazine, Issue #3, October 2007
 “The Moldy Dead”, Apex Science Fiction and Horror Digest, Issue #11, November 2007
 “Discerning Tastes”, Aberrant Dreams, January 2008 Issue
 “Twelve-A”, Apex Online, Featured Writer, February 2008
 “Glacial Melt”, Shroud Magazine
 “Face Cards”, Cemetery Dance Magazine

Awards and recognitions

In 2001, King received an Honorable Mention from the University of Alaska's 21st Annual Creative Writing Contest for her poetry piece, "Untitled."

King has twice received Honorable Mentions from the Writers of the Future Contest; her first from the First Quarter 2007 contest for her 8,000-word short work "Parasite" and her second in the Fourth Quarter 2007 for the 7,900-word short piece "Fury of the Sphinx".  She became a semi-finalist in the contest in the First Quarter 2008 with the 10,000-word novelette "The Auldhund."

References

External links

1982 births
Living people
21st-century American novelists
American science fiction writers
American women short story writers
American women novelists
Science fiction editors
Women science fiction and fantasy writers
21st-century American women writers
21st-century American short story writers
Writers from Alaska
People from Anchorage, Alaska